The 2022 ICF Canoe Slalom World Championships took place from 26 to 31 July 2022 in Augsburg, Germany under the auspices of International Canoe Federation (ICF). It was the 42nd edition. The events took place at the Augsburg Eiskanal. Augsburg hosted the championships for the fourth time after previously hosting in 1957, 1985 and 2003.

The championships took place 50 years after canoe slalom first appeared at the Summer Olympics when the events were held on the same course.

A total of 380 athletes from 70 countries participated in the event. Russia and Belarus were excluded from participation due to the 2022 Russian invasion of Ukraine.

Schedule
Ten medal events were contested.

All times listed are UTC+2.

Medal summary

Medal table

Men

Canoe

Kayak

Women

Canoe

Kayak

References

External links

Official website

ICF Canoe Slalom World Championships
World Championships
ICF
ICF